Black Bullet is a 2014 science fiction Japanese anime series adapted from the light novels of the same name written by Shiden Kanzaki and illustrated by Saki Ukai. In 2021 a biological agent known as the Gastrea Virus suddenly appeared and decimated most of the planet's population. After ten years of living in fear, humanity utilizes a newly discovered metal called Varanium to construct numerous monolithic structures which defend against the virus. Born into a world on the brink of collapse, Promoter Rentaro Satomi and the ten-year-old Initiator Enju Aihara of the Tendo Civil Security Agency work dangerous missions, in the hope to one day liberate humanity from the terror of the Gastrea Virus.

The anime is produced by Kinema Citrus and directed by Masayuki Kojima, with script writing by Tatsuhiko Urahata, character designs by Chiho Umishima and music by Shirō Sagisu. The series was broadcast on AT-X from April 8 to July 1, 2014, with later airings on Tokyo MX, Sun TV, KBS, tvk, TV Aichi and BS11 along with online streaming on Niconico. The series was picked up by Crunchyroll for online simulcast streaming in North America and other select parts of the world. NBCUniversal Entertainment began releasing the series in Japan on Blu-ray and DVD volumes starting on July 2, 2014. The anime was licensed by Sentai Filmworks for distribution via select digital outlets and a home media release in North America. The series was also acquired by Hanabee Entertainment for release in Australia.

Four pieces of theme music are used: an opening theme and three ending themes.



Episode list

Home media
NBCUniversal Entertainment began releasing the series in Japan on Blu-ray and DVD volumes starting on July 2, 2014. Sentai Filmworks released the series in Region 1 on Blu-ray and DVD format on October 27, 2015.

Notes

References

External links
Official anime website 

Black Bullet